"In the Rain" is a 1972 song by The Dramatics.

In the Rain may also refer to:

 In the Rain (Lim Yee Chung album)
 In the Rain (Sol Invictus album)
 "In the Rain", a song by Estelle from Shine
 "In the Rain", a song by Alexandra Burke from The Truth Is
 "In the Rain", Smooth jazz music by Kenny G, from the 1992 Breathless album.